Seven ships of the Royal Navy have been named HMS Royal Sovereign, while another was planned but renamed before being launched:

  was a 102-gun first rate ship of the line launched in 1637. She was rebuilt in 1660 and renamed Royal Sovereign, rebuilt again in 1685 and burnt by accident in 1697.
  was a 100-gun first-rate launched in 1701. She underwent a "great repair" (1722–1725) so extensive that the result might be considered a new ship. She was finally broken up in 1768.
  was a 100-gun first-rate launched in 1786. She was at the Battle of Trafalgar, renamed HMS Captain after being reduced to harbour service in 1825, and was broken up in 1841.
  was a yacht launched in 1804 and broken up in 1849.
 HMS Royal Sovereign was to have been a 110-gun first-rate. She was ordered in 1833, renamed  in 1839, then  in 1860, before being launched later that year. She became a training ship named Worcester in 1876, was sold in 1948 and foundered that year.
  was a 121-gun screw first-rate launched in 1857. She was converted between 1861 and 1863 into the first turret ship of the Royal Navy. She was sold for breaking in 1885.
  was a  launched in 1891 and scrapped in 1913.
  was a  launched in 1915. She was transferred to the Soviet Navy in 1944 and renamed , and in 1949 sent back to Britain and scrapped.

MV Royal Sovereign, a cross-channel passenger boat owned by the New Medway Steam Packet Company, was requisitioned for use as a troop transport in 1939 and participated in the Dunkirk evacuation in May 1940. Renamed HMS Royal Scot, she struck a mine and sank in the Bristol Channel in December 1940.

Battle honours
Ships named Royal Sovereign have earned the following battle honours:

Kentish Knock, 1652
Orfordness, 1666
Sole Bay, 1672
Schooneveld, 1673
Texel, 1673
Barfleur, 1692
Vigo, 1702
First of June, 1794
Cornwallis's Retreat, 1795
Trafalgar, 1805
Dunkirk, 19401
Calabria, 1940
Atlantic, 1940−41

1: Awarded to merchant vessel MV Royal Sovereign

Notes 

Royal Navy ship names